Ravi Bhushan (born 12 April 1953, in Muzaffarnagar, India) was a Professor of Chemistry at Indian Institute of Technology Roorkee who worked in the areas of natural products chemistry, protein chemistry, and chiral analysis by liquid chromatography.

Education and academic career 

Bhushan began his education in his native India, completing his undergraduate degree  and his masters from the University of Jodhpur. He received his Ph.D. in chemistry (working on structure elucidation of natural products isolated from certain desert plants) in 1978 at the University of Jodhpur. Bhushan joined as lecturer at the University of Roorkee (now Indian Institute of Technology Roorkee, India) in 1979 and was later selected for the position of full professor of chemistry in 1996 and served there till retirement in 2018.

Research 
He started his research in the chemistry of natural products. At Washington State University  he established early steps in metabolism of d-neomethyl-α-D-glucoside in pipermint (Mentha piperita) rhizomes via in vivo studies. Bhushan developed a de novo method for direct resolution of certain racemates by liquid chromatography. Later, the approach was applied for direct enantioseparation of several active pharmaceutical ingredients (APIs). It is now an established approach in literature. 1994 onwards, the method was extended to such resolutions by ligand exchange principle. The method is of significant importance to pharmaceutical industry and analytical laboratories associated with regulatory agencies for determination and control of enantiomeric purity (and isolation of native enantiomers) of a variety of APIs since many of them are marketed and administered as racemic mixture while only one enantiomer is therapeutically useful.

Bhushan supervised the Ph.D. theses of > 30 scholars and has published more than 270 research papers.

Editorial work 
Bhushan is a member of editorial board of 
 Biomedical Chromatography, (John Wiley & Sons, UK, since Jan 1996); 
 Bioanalysis (Future Science Group, UK, since 2011), and 
 Acta Chromatographica (Akademiai Kiado, Hungary, since 2012).

Honours and awards
 1988 Alexander von Humboldt fellowship of Germany: Research with Jürgen Martens at the University of Oldenburg  and Hans Brückner University of Giessen.
 1992 European Economic Community Fellowship: Research with Peter Shewry University of Bristol
 1993 Fellow of the Royal Society of Chemistry
 2001 Fellow of the National Academy of Sciences India

References

1953 births
Living people
IIT Roorkee alumni
20th-century Indian chemists
21st-century Indian chemists
Analytical chemists
Fellows of the Royal Society of Chemistry